Licata  is a surname. Notable people with the surname include:

 Antonio Licata (1810 - 1892), Italian painter
 Augusto Licata (1851-1942), Italian painter
 Ignazio Licata (born 1958), Italian theoretical physicist, professor
 Joe Licata (born 1992), American football coach and former quarterback
 Rosario Licata (born 1989), Italian footballer
 Victor Licata (c. 1912 – 1950), American mass murderer

See also 
 Licata (disambiguation)
 Nick Licata

Italian-language surnames